, commonly known as Okinawa SV (沖縄SV, Okinawa Esubi) is a Japanese football club based in the cities of Tomigusuku and Uruma, which are located in Okinawa Prefecture. Okinawa will play from the 2023 season at the Japan Football League, Japan's 4th-tier league.

History
After leaving SC Sagamihara and retiring from professional football, former Japan National Team international Naohiro Takahara decided to found a new club in Okinawa. The main part of the club's identity comes from two overseas clubs, in which Takahara played in during his career. The name of the club was inspired by German Hamburger SV, which influenced Takahara to found the club as Okinawa Sport-Verein (a German term meaning "sports club"). The kit's colours and its design are inspired by Argentinian Boca Juniors, who uses blue and yellow colors in their kits since 1907.

Takahara set himself as president, manager-player and captain, helping the Kyushu-based club to start from the bottom of Japanese football. In their first year, on 2016, Okinawa SV featured in the 3rd division of the Okinawa Prefectural League in a highly successful debut, remaining unbeaten while also scoring 123 goals, and only conceding a single one. The Okinawa Football Association opted to give the club a free pass to join the 1st Division of the Prefectural League. In their 2nd season, Okinawa SV achieved another promotion, now to the Kyushu Soccer League.

On 27 November 2022, Okinawa SV was promoted to JFL for the first time in their history. They were assured of promotion after defeating FC Kariya by 4–0 at their last match on the Regional Champions League final round. Okinawa SV just needed 6 seasons to jump from the 3rd division of Okinawa Prefectural League to the national stage, at Japan's 4th division.

Stadium 
After playing at Okinawa Kincho Football Center in 2022, Okinawa SV play every home matches at Tapic Kenso Hiyagon Stadium in JFL for 2023 season after announcement fully schedule on 10 February 2023.

League and cup record 
(x,y) in column D denotes number of win and lost in shootout.

Key

Emperor's Cup record

Honours
Okinawa Prefectural League
Champions (1): 2016

Kyushu Soccer League
Champions (3): 2019, 2021, 2022

Japanese Regional Football Champions League
Runners-up (1): 2022

Current squad

Kit evolution

Coaching staff
For the 2023 season.

References

External links
Official Site 
Official Facebook Page
Official Twitter Account

Football clubs in Japan
Sports teams in Okinawa Prefecture
Association football clubs established in 2015
2015 establishments in Japan
Japan Football League clubs